Emma Greco (born March 6, 1995) is a Canadian ice hockey defender, currently playing with the Toronto Six of the Premier Hockey Federation (PHF). Greco has been described as a reliable stay-at-home defenceman.

Playing career 

Greco began playing hockey at the age of five, her parents encouraging her to play the sport instead of figure skating. She attended Aldershot School where she played varsity field hockey, soccer, ice hockey, and badminton in addition to playing basketball, volleyball, and softball throughout her high school career. During the later three years of high school, she also played ice hockey with the Toronto Jr. Aeros of the Provincial Women's Hockey League (PWHL), serving as team captain in her final year. As a senior, Greco was named the 2013 Aldershot Female Athlete of the Year and the City of Burlington's High School Female Athlete of the Year.

NCAA

From 2013 to 2017, she played with the Quinnipiac Bobcats women's ice hockey program in the ECAC Hockey conference of the NCAA Division I, scoring 25 points in 144 games. She scored her first collegiate career goal in February of her third year, the game-winning goal in a 4–0 victory over Rensselaer. That year, she would be named to the ECAC Hockey All-Tournament Team, leading her team in blocked shots.

Professional

After graduating, she signed her first professional contract with the Connecticut Whale of the PHF. She picked up two assists in six games during the 2017–18 season with the Whale.  Ahead of the 2018–19 season, she left the Whale to return to Canada and sign with the Toronto Furies of the Canadian Women's Hockey League.

After the collapse of the CWHL in May 2019, she joined the newly-formed Professional Women's Hockey Players Association (PWHPA), and spent the 2019–20 season playing with the organisation's Greater Toronto Area (GTA) West hub. She played for Team Knox at the Unifor Showcase in September 2019 and participated in the PWHPA's Equal Sweat Deserves Equal Opportunity rally in Toronto in January 2020.

She returned to the PHF ahead of the 2020–21 NWHL season, signing with the expansion Toronto Six and was one of the first five players to be announced for the team. The leadership for the inaugural season included Greco, who served as one of the alternate captains with Emma Woods, while Shiann Darkangelo appointed as the first team captain in franchise history. Competing in the Six’s first-ever game, a January 23, 2021 affair at Lake Placid’s Herb Brooks Arena versus the Metropolitan Riveters, Greco would be called for interference at the 3:01 mark of the first period, recording the first penalty in franchise history.

Personal life 

Greco has a bachelor's degree in business and marketing from Quinnipiac University. While pursuing her MBA at Qunnipiac, she played with the Quinnipiac Bobcats women's soccer team for the 2017 season, appearing in 15 games, including 14 starts.

References

External links

Living people
1995 births
Canadian women's ice hockey defencemen
Sportspeople from Burlington, Ontario
Ice hockey people from Ontario
Toronto Six players
Professional Women's Hockey Players Association players
Toronto Furies players
Connecticut Whale (PHF) players
Quinnipiac Bobcats women's ice hockey players
Canadian expatriate ice hockey players in the United States